Mark Day may refer to:

Mark Day (racing driver) (born 1961), American racecar driver
Mark Day (actor) (born 1978), Canadian actor
Mark Day (film editor) (born 1958), British film editor
Mark Day (singer), Canadian Idol season 6 contestant
Mark Day (musician), member of the Happy Mondays